The Pomona–Claremont Line was a Pacific Electric streetcar line in Southern California. Unlike most of the company's services, cars did not travel to Downtown Los Angeles and instead provided a suburban service between Pomona, Claremont, and Upland.

History
The Ontario and San Antonio Heights Railroad Company opened the line On January 1, 1911 as their second route after the Ontario–San Antonio Heights Line. After Pomona Junction, cars ran over Pacific Electric tracks to the center of Pomona.

Pacific Electric acquired the company on April 13, 1912 and promptly began operating services between Pomona and Ontario. Cars were initially interlined with the Upland–Ontario Line. Service east of Claremont ended in November 1918, which also ended the through-routing. One trip was extended to Upland starting in 1922. By the end of its life in 1932, many trips were short turn shuttles running between Pomona and North Pomona with transfers to the San Bernardino Line.

Route
Originating from the Pomona Pacific Electric Station at Third Street and Garey Avenue, the Pomona–Claremont Line proceeded north on Garey Avenue, as far as Cadillac Drive. From there, the line proceeded in a northeasterly direction in a private right of way until it joined the San Bernardino Line, just east of Maple Avenue. From there, the Pomona–Claremont ran on the San Bernardino Line to College Avenue in Claremont.

References

Pacific Electric routes
Railway lines opened in 1911
1911 establishments in California
Railway services discontinued in 1932
1932 disestablishments in California
Closed railway lines in the United States